Sebeliau is a riverside village in the Lubok Antu division of Sarawak, Malaysia.

Sebeliau jetty is the embarkation point for tourists travelling up the Lemanak River to visit an Iban longhouse.

Neighbouring settlements include:

References

Villages in Sarawak